Assiniboine Valley Railway (AVR) was a private 1:8th (1.6" to the foot) scale ridable miniature railway located in the community of Charleswood near Assiniboine Park in Winnipeg, Manitoba, Canada.

Construction started in 1995 and operation began in the fall of 1996. A train station was eventually built along the track, and opened on time for a convention in May, 2000.

The railway is owned and operated by the 23-member Assiniboine Valley Railway Club, Inc., with some of the equipment privately owned by members. The railway club president and owner of the land was Bill Taylor until his death in 2013. Presidency then transferred to vice president and co-founder Len La Rue. The network of tracks and "Charleswood Station" was located on Taylor's private  family property.

AVR was open to the public for riding during the second weekend of the month between June and October. 
 the railway had nine operating locomotives, including three steam locomotives and 53 cars, with eight more cars under construction.

During the COVID-19 pandemic, the club had to close to the public as a result of provincial public health orders. 

In April 2021, the family of AVR's late founder requested that the railway club vacate the property within six months.

History 

In the early years of the railway, Christmas lights runs were operated every night from 6:30 pm till 9:00 pm. from the second weekend of December to the first weekend of January. Christmas lights were used along the line, their numbers growing from 98,000 in 2009  to more than 100,000, reaching 101,213 by December 9, 2012.

See also

List of heritage railways in Canada
Model train scales
Model train

References

External links
 Assiniboine Valley Railway
 Rapido Trains Review of Model Trains in Canadian Prairies
 Kid-Friendly Manitoba Reviews "Christmas at the Taylors" run by AVR

Heritage railways in Manitoba
7½ in gauge railways in Canada
Transport in Winnipeg